(shortened to , more simply J1433) is a binary system composed of a white dwarf and a brown dwarf. The brown dwarf is about 57 Jupiter masses and has transitioned from a stellar object to a brown dwarf due to losing mass to the white dwarf.  As of 2016, this was the only known binary of this type.

References

External links
 Stellar cannibalism transforms star into brown dwarf University of Southampton

Brown dwarfs
White dwarfs
SDSS objects
Boötes